David Bauer may refer to:

David Bauer (actor) (1917–1973), American actor who made numerous appearances in ITC Entertainment productions
David Bauer (ice hockey) (1924–1988), Canadian ice hockey player, coach and priest
David Bauer (editor), managing editor of Sports Illustrated, former editor of Sport